Julie Carpenter, born Julie Gwyn Wajdyk, is an American researcher whose work focuses on human behavior with emerging technologies, especially within vulnerable and marginalized populations. She is best known for her work in human attachment to robots and other forms of artificial intelligence.

Education
Carpenter has a Ph.D. in educational psychology from the University of Washington, an M.S. in Technical Communication/Human-Computer Interaction from Rensselaer Polytechnic Institute, a second M.S. from the Technical Communication (now Human-Centered Design and Engineering) program at the University of Washington, and a B.A. in Communication Arts (Film, Radio, and Television Theory) from the University of Wisconsin-Madison.

Work
Her 2016 book Culture and Human-Robot Interaction in Militarized Spaces: A War Story explores the social role of robots in the military, specifically experiences reported by Explosive Ordinance Disposal personnel and their social interactions with robots they use in their work. More recently, she has written about human sexuality and robotic systems in Sex Robots: Social and ethical implications. In her chapter "Deux sex machina: Loving robot sex workers and the allure of an insincere kiss", Carpenter proposes incorporating a temporal component to Mori's Uncanny Valley hypothesis to account for individual changes in feelings of familiarity after repeated exposure to humanoid robots, as well as larger cultural shifts of acceptance toward humanoid robots over time.

Carpenter has said in interviews that she has been influenced by the robot designs of David Hanson and the science fiction writing of Zenna Henderson and Philip K. Dick.

Recent work also includes acting as a volunteer research consultant to collaborate with VICE and VIRTUE Nordic on Q, the world's first nonbinary human voice for use with technology. In 2019, Q won the Glass Lion for Change and three bronze Lions in audio categories at Cannes. She also gave a 2016 TEDx talk in Odense, Denmark, Humans + Robots: Dream Machines.

Carpenter made the 100 Brilliant Women in AI Ethics List in 2019 and 2020 and was part of the Women in AI Ethics Council, 2020 spearheading Roles & Rights dimension of WAIE Ethical Framework.

Publications

Books
 Culture and Human-Robot Interaction in Militarized Spaces: A War Story, author, 2016. UK: Routledge/Taylor & Francis
 Deus Sex Machina: Loving Robot Sex Workers and the Allure of an Insincere Kiss, 2017. In J. Danaher and N. MacArthur (Eds.), Sex Robots: Social, Ethical, and Legal Implications. MIT Press: Cambridge, MA
Kill Switch: The Evolution of Road Rage in an Increasingly AI Car Culture, 2020. In E. DeVisser, R. Pak, and E. Rovira (Eds.), Living with robots: Emerging issues on the psychological and social implications of robotics. Amsterdam: Elsevier
Robots as Solace and the Valence of Loneliness, 2021. In Aifric Campbell (Ed.), The Love Makers. UK: Goldsmiths Press
The Naked Android: Synthetic Socialness and the Human Gaze, In press, expected 2022. UK: CRC Press/Routledge
A Solitary Thing: Emotional Intimacy and the Idea of Cheating in Committed Human-Human Relationships with a Robot, In press, expected 2022. In Jordi Vallverdú (Ed.), Gender in AI and Robotics: The Gender Challenges from an Interdisciplinary Perspective. UAB, Ed. Switzerland: Springer

Selected publications
 Why Project Q is more than the world's first nonbinary voice for technology, author, 2019
 Gender Representation and Humanoid Robots Designed for Domestic Use, co-author, 2009

References

External links
 
 "Gaze and Golems": an interview with J. Carpenter by Johannes Grenzfurthner in "The Free Lunch" (2020)

Living people
Scientists from Madison, Wisconsin
University of Washington alumni
Year of birth missing (living people)
American women scientists
Rensselaer Polytechnic Institute alumni
University of Wisconsin–Madison School of Journalism & Mass Communication alumni
American technology writers
Artificial intelligence researchers
Artificial intelligence ethicists
21st-century American women